2004 Aluminium is aluminium alloy in 2xxx series, which has Copper as main alloying element and some impurity elements.

Chemical Composition

References 

Aluminium–copper alloys